Harley is a hamlet in the civil parish of Wentworth, in the Rotherham district lying to the north of Rotherham and Sheffield, South Yorkshire, England.

References 

Hamlets in South Yorkshire
Wentworth, South Yorkshire